Toby arrives is the debut studio album by American instrumental band Koch Marshall Trio. Released on February 23, 2018, the album has received praise from many reviewers.

Background
The "Toby Arrives" album title is in reference to the Hammond organ player Toby Lee Marshall. Dylan Koch insisted that Greg Koch play with Marshall. The three musicians got together to play at a local studio that had a B3 organ. During their very first time performing together, the three of them wrote the title track to Toby Arrives.

Release and reception
 
The album Toby Arrives is entirely instrumental. Both Greg Koch and Marshall have each spent the majority of their careers playing instrumental songs.

The Koch Marshall Trio's debut album Toby Arrives contains songs that, "morph into an amazing new relationship with organ influenced Blues Rock."

The first studio album by the Koch Marshall Trio has received high praise. Pendragon's review of the album borders on hyperbole: "‘Toby Arrives’ is the sort of album you could stack alongside a Thelonious Monk record, a Jeff Beck record or a Mike Landau record. If you went for one of the other three and got this by mistake your day wouldn't be ruined."

Scope Magazine's R.M. Engleman praised the mix of classic and non-traditional styles, saying "Greg’s playing is a little jazzy, a little funky, and the riffs are untraditionally cool...A lot of little nuances here with both the B3 and guitar.

Track listing

Personnel

Koch Marshall Trio
Greg Koch – Lead guitar, Rhythm guitar, Vocals
Toby Lee Marshall – Hammond Organ
Dylan Koch – Drums

References

2018 debut albums
Koch Marshall Trio albums
Mascot Label Group albums